Suphisellus epleri is a species of burrowing water beetle in the subfamily Noterinae. It was described by Arce-Pérez & Baca in 2017.

References

Suphisellus
Beetles described in 2017